Czech Vašek (literal. "Czech Václav") is a historical figure representing the national character of the Czech people used in time of national competition with German nationalism at the end of the 19th century.

Overview
Such figures differ from those that serve as personifications of the nation itself, as Čechie did the Czech nation and Marianne the French.  He is usually depicted in a folk costume combining hat from Pilsen region with clothes from different regions.

They were used as a negative caricature of Czechs by Germans, symbolising them as street musicians. But also positively by Czech themselves.

Czech Vašek is considered a counterpart to Deutscher Michel, a figure representing the national character of the German people.

See also 
Flag of the Czech Republic
Čechie, personification of Czechs
Deutscher Michel, personification of the German people

References

National personifications
National symbols of the Czech Republic